Italy competed at the 1956 Summer Olympics in Melbourne, Australia and Stockholm, Sweden (equestrian events). 129 competitors, 114 men and 15 women, took part in 76 events in 13 sports. As the country hosted the next Olympics in Rome, an Italian segment was performed at the closing ceremony.

Medalists

Gold
Leandro Faggin — Cycling, Men's 1.000m Time Trial 
Antonio Domenicali, Leandro Faggin, Valentino Gasparella, Franco Gandini and Virginio Pizzali — Cycling, Men's 4.000m Team Pursuit 
Ercole Baldini — Cycling, Men's Individual Road Race 
Luigi Carpaneda, Manlio di Rosa, Giancarlo Bergamini, Edoardo Mangiarotti, Antonio Spallino, and Vittorio Lucarelli — Fencing, Men's Foil Team
Carlo Pavesi — Fencing, Men's Épée Individual
Giorgio Anglesio, Franco Bertinetti, Giuseppe Delfino, Edoardo Mangiarotti, Carlo Pavesi, and Alberto Pellegrino — Fencing, Men's Épée Team
Alberto Winkler, Romano Sgheiz, Angelo Vanzin, Franco Trincavelli, and Ivo Stefanoni — Rowing, Men's Coxed Fours 
Galliano Rossini — Shooting, Men's Trap Shooting

Silver
Franco Nenci — Boxing, Men's Light Welterweight
Guglielmo Pesenti — Cycling, Men's 1.000m Sprint (Scratch) 
Raimondo d'Inzeo — Equestrian, Jumping Individual
Piero d'Inzeo, Raimondo d'Inzeo, and Salvatore Oppes — Equestrian, Jumping Team
Giancarlo Bergamini — Fencing, Men's Foil Individual
Giuseppe Delfino — Fencing, Men's Épée Individual
Ignazio Fabra — Wrestling, Men's Greco-Roman Flyweight
Agostino Straulino and Nicolò Rode — Sailing, Men's Star Competition

Bronze
Giacomo Bozzano — Boxing, Men's Heavyweight
Giuseppe Ogna and Cesare Pinarello — Cycling, Men's 2.000m Tandem 
Piero d'Inzeo — Equestrian, Jumping Individual
Antonio Spallino — Fencing, Men's Foil Individual
Edoardo Mangiarotti — Fencing, Men's Épée Individual
Alessandro Ciceri — Shooting, Men's Trap Shooting
Ermanno Pignatti — Weightlifting, Men's Middleweight 
Alberto Pigaiani — Weightlifting, Men's Heavyweight 
Adelmo Bulgarelli — Wrestling, Men's Greco-Roman Heavyweight

Athletics

Results

Boxing

Cycling

Sprint
Guglielmo Pesenti —  Silver Medal

Time trial
Leandro Faggin — 1:09.8 (→  Gold Medal)

Tandem
Cesare PinarelloGiuseppe Ogna —  Bronze Medal

Team pursuit
Antonio DomenicaliFranco GandiniLeandro FagginValentino GasparellaVirginio Pizzali — 4:37.4 (→  Gold Medal)

Team road race
Ercole BaldiniArnaldo PambiancoDino Bruni — 36 points (→ 4th place)

Individual road race
Ercole Baldini — 5:21:17 (→  Gold Medal)
Arnaldo Pambianco — 5:23:40 (→ 7th place)
Dino Bruni — 5:27:28 (→ 28th place)
Aurelio Cestari — 5:34:20 (→ 34th place)

Fencing

19 fencers, 17 men and 2 women, represented Italy in 1956.

Men's foil
 Giancarlo Bergamini
 Antonio Spallino
 Edoardo Mangiarotti

Men's team foil
 Edoardo Mangiarotti, Manlio Di Rosa, Giancarlo Bergamini, Antonio Spallino, Luigi Carpaneda, Vittorio Lucarelli

Men's épée
 Carlo Pavesi
 Giuseppe Delfino
 Edoardo Mangiarotti

Men's team épée
 Edoardo Mangiarotti, Giuseppe Delfino, Carlo Pavesi, Franco Bertinetti, Giorgio Anglesio, Alberto Pellegrino

Men's sabre
 Luigi Narduzzi
 Roberto Ferrari
 Gastone Darè

Men's team sabre
 Roberto Ferrari, Domenico Pace, Mario Ravagnan, Giuseppe Comini, Luigi Narduzzi, Gastone Darè

Women's foil
 Bruna Colombetti-Peroncini
 Velleda Cesari

Gymnastics

Modern pentathlon

One male pentathlete represented Italy in 1956.

Individual
 Adriano Facchini

Rowing

Italy had 21 male rowers participate in five out of seven rowing events in 1956.

 Men's single sculls
 Stefano Martinoli

 Men's coxless pair
 Alvaro Banchi
 Maurizio Clerici

 Men's coxless four
 Giuseppe Moioli
 Attilio Cantoni
 Giovanni Zucchi
 Abbondio Marcelli

 Men's coxed four
 Alberto Winkler
 Romano Sgheiz
 Angelo Vanzin
 Franco Trincavelli
 Ivo Stefanoni (cox)

 Men's eight
 Antonio Amato
 Salvatore Nuvoli
 Cosimo Campioto
 Livio Tesconi
 Antonio Casoar
 Gian Carlo Casalini
 Sergio Tagliapietra
 Arrigo Menicocci
 Vincenzo Rubolotta (cox)

Sailing

Shooting

Five shooters represented Italy in 1956. In the trap event, Galliano Rossini won gold and Alessandro Ciceri won bronze.

25 m pistol
 Michelangelo Borriello

50 m pistol
 Claudio Fiorentini

50 m rifle, three positions
 Carlo Varetto

Trap
 Galliano Rossini
 Alessandro Ciceri

Swimming

Men's 4 × 200 m Freestyle Relay
Federico Dennerlein, Paolo Galletti, Guido Elmi, and Anthony Romani
 Final — 8:46.2 (→ 7th place)

Water polo

Men's Team Competition
Team Roster
Cosimo Antonelli
Alfonso Buonocore
Enzo Cavazzoni
Maurizio d'Achille
Giuseppe d'Altrui
Federico Dennerlein
Luigi Mannelli
Angelo Marciani
Paolo Pucci
Cesare Rubini

Weightlifting

Wrestling

References

External links
Official Olympic Reports
International Olympic Committee results database
 

Nations at the 1956 Summer Olympics
1956
1956 in Italian sport